Mark Warner is a songwriter, studio musician and music producer from California.

Warner has received acknowledgement from the music industry for his songwriting contributions. In 2001 he won the Paramount Music Summer Songwriting Contest. He was also recognized for his lyrical accomplishments in the October 2001 edition of ASCAP Playback Magazine.

Warner credits several guitarists for providing his early musical influence, including Jimmy Page, Joe Perry and Peter Frampton. Later artistic influences include Tom Keifer and Jani Lane.

Warner is best known for his electric and acoustic work on the Allen Crane Broken Promises EP which was released on The Orchard Records in 2000 and features several notable artists including Cinderella drummer Fred Coury.

Warner has since written material for, and co-produced other artists alongside former Sony Records veteran engineer and producer Voytek Kochanek at Atlantis Studio Nashville.

References 

Atlantis Studio Nashville, public production credits database
American Society of Composers Authors and Publishers, public writing credits ACE database
American Society of Composers Authors and Publishers, Playback Magazine October 2001
The Orchard Records, corporate release information

External links 
Allen Crane website, includes recent activity and contact information.
Allen Crane website, includes biography and individual credits.

American rock guitarists
American male guitarists
Songwriters from Tennessee
Living people
Guitarists from Tennessee
Year of birth missing (living people)
American male songwriters